The Consortia Advancing Standards in Research Administration Information (CASRAI) is an international, non-profit  "membership initiative led by research institutions and their partners." Founded in 2006, it is a  corporation registered in Ottawa, Ontario, Canada, and is overseen by a central Board of Directors and national Steering Committees in each country with a national chapter.

The CASRAI mission is to adapt the principles and best practices of open standards and data governance to lead and facilitate key stakeholders in annual deliberations to develop 'standard information agreements' that serve as bridges between research information users. CASRAI agreements cover all the key information requirements that relate to the management of research throughout its life cycle. This includes information requirements related to applications for funds, CVs, project and funds management, compliance requirements, reporting as well as research data management and scholarly communications. The CASRAI vision is for all stakeholders (institutions, funders, publishers and software providers) to adopt the resulting 'invisible infrastructure' in their local software and processes so we can collectively enable stable, predictable and comparable results when sharing research information throughout the life cycle.

History 
In keeping with Canadian laws governing the creation of not-for-profit corporations CASRAI was founded by private Canadian citizens David Baker, Adil Hamdouna and Abder Loukili when they were co-directors in eVision Inc., a software consultancy based in Quebec City. The three formed the initial Board of Directors until early members could be appointed - at which point the original founders stepped down. David Baker continued on in the role of Executive Director reporting to the board. CASRAI was founded as the result of expressed interest from two of the three federal government granting councils in Canada in response to difficulties they were encountering smoothly flowing research information between sister funders and with research institutions. In 2015 CASRAI shifted its governance from a funder-driven model to an institution-driven model with funders as key partners.

References

External links 

 

Research organizations
International scientific organizations
Scientific organizations based in Canada
2006 establishments in Ontario
Organizations based in Ottawa
Organizations established in 2006